Leucospermum innovans is an upright evergreen shrub with many pustules growing on the lower branches, wedge-shaped leaves, and oval, flower heads that are yellow on the outside, but with scarlet stripes on the inside of the perianth claws, with long styles sticking far beyond the perianths, jointly giving the impression of a pincushion. It is called Pondoland pincushion or Transkei pincushion in English. Flowers occur on and off between July and December, but flowering peaks in September and October.

Description 

The bracts subtending the head are broadly oval with a pointy tip 1 cm long and 8 mm wide, cartilaginous in consistency, the outer surface densely felty, and distinctly grey near the tip.

The middle part (or claws) is densely felty and also has  straight long hairs on the outer surface, all strongly curled back after the flower opens. The upper part (or limbs), which enclosed the pollen presenter in the bud, are very narrowly ellipse-shaped, each about 5 mm long and 1½ mm wide, felty with in addition long straight hairs. The limb facing the edge of the head is less densely felty than the other three.

Differences with related species 
L. innovans differs from its close relative L. cuneiforme because it has very broadly wedge-shaped to inverted egg-shaped leaves, 3–5 cm wide, deeply incised with five to ten teeth near the tip, and the lower, merged part of the perianth, called tube, is somewhat compressed sideways, narrow near the foot but somewhat bulging higher up. L. cuneiforme on the other hand has narrow to broadly wedge-shaped leaves 0.6–3 cm wide, with three to ten teeth, and the perianth tube cylinder-shaped and slightly compressed sideways.

Taxonomy 
As far as known, the Pondoland pincushion was first collected for science by a Mr. William Tyson in October 1885. This and later collected plants that are now considered to belong to the Pondoland pincushion were initially identified as L. attenuatum R.Br. (now Leucospermum cuneiforme). In 1970, John Patrick Rourke decided the differences with L. cuneiforme are consistent, and he described it as a new species, calling it Leucospermum innovans.

Leucospermum innovans is assigned to the cylindric pincushions, section Crassicaudex.

The species name innovans is Latin and means “novelty”.

Distribution, habitat and ecology 
The Pondoland pincushion appears in a vegetation type called Pondoland Coastal Plateau Sourveld, always on or near outcrops of Table Mountain Sandstone.

The species is a very resistant to fire, and new shoots appear quickly from the underground rootstock after the above grond parts have been burnt off.

The Pondoland pincushion is pollinated by birds. The fruits are ripe about two months after flowering and fall to the ground. Here, these are collected by ants who carry them to their underground nests.

Conservation 

References

External links 
 several photos

Endemic flora of South Africa
cuneiforme
Plants described in 1970